In mathematics, a  non-autonomous system of ordinary differential equations is defined to be a dynamic equation on a smooth fiber bundle  over . For instance, this is the case of non-relativistic non-autonomous mechanics, but not relativistic mechanics. Therefore, it is called the relativistic system. In particular, Special Relativity on the
Minkowski space  is of this type.

Since a configuration space  of a relativistic system has no
velocity space of relativistic system is a first order jet
The notion of jets of submanifolds
generalizes that of jets of sections
of fiber bundles which are utilized in covariant classical field theory and
non-autonomous mechanics. A first order jet bundle  is projective and, following the terminology of Special Relativity, one can think of its fibers as being spaces
of the absolute velocities of a relativistic system.
possessing transition functions 

 

The relativistic velocities of a relativistic system are represented by
Then a generic equation of motion of a relativistic system in terms of relativistic velocities reads

 

 

For instance, if  is the Minkowski space with a Minkowski metric , this is an equation of a relativistic charge in the presence of an electromagnetic field.

See also
 Non-autonomous system (mathematics)
 Non-autonomous mechanics
 Relativistic mechanics
 Special relativity

References 
 Krasil'shchik, I. S., Vinogradov, A. M., [et al.], "Symmetries and conservation laws for differential equations of mathematical physics", Amer. Math. Soc., Providence, RI, 1999, .
 Giachetta, G., Mangiarotti, L., Sardanashvily, G., Geometric Formulation of Classical and Quantum Mechanics (World Scientific, 2010)    .

Differential equations
Classical mechanics
Theory of relativity